Shōnen Jump or Shonen Jump may refer to:
Weekly Shōnen Jump, a Japanese manga anthology magazine published by Shueisha since 1968
Jump (magazine line)
Shōnen Jump+, a digital magazine and mobile application started in 2014
Monthly Shōnen Jump, a former sister publication of Weekly Shōnen Jump, published from 1970 to 2007
Shonen Jump (magazine), a former American manga anthology magazine based on Weekly Shōnen Jump and published by Viz Media from 2002 to 2012
Weekly Shonen Jump (American magazine), an American digital publication that replaced the print-based Shonen Jump, published by Viz Media since 2012, formerly named Weekly Shonen Jump Alpha